Extasy Records is a Japanese record label founded in April 1986 by Yoshiki Hayashi, co-founder of the heavy metal band X Japan. The label's first release was X's 1986 single "Orgasm".

Over the next few years, the label signed several then-little-known bands, among them future million-selling Glay and Luna Sea. Extasy along with Free-Will are credited with helping to spread the visual kei movement. The label also hosted a series of events to promote the groups, called Extasy Summits, which would also feature formerly signed bands that had already moved on to a major label.

History
Yoshiki Hayashi founded Extasy Records in Japan in 1986, using money he received from his mother when she sold her business. His band X Japan (then still named X) released their second single, "Orgasm", as the label's first release. In 1988, their debut album Vanishing Vision came out and was a huge success for an independent band. Over the next couple of years Extasy signed many bands that would go on to have varying degrees of success and produced their early records, including Zi:Kill, Tokyo Yankees and Ladies Room.

In February 1991, Yoshiki's X Japan bandmate hide saw a band called Lunacy perform, and introduced him to them. Yoshiki signed them to Extasy, they changed their name to Luna Sea and took part in the label's Nuclear Fusion Tour in March with Gilles de Rais and Sighs of Love Potion. On the tour, a 3-track sample CD including a song from each band was released. The following year Luna Sea's self-titled debut album was released and they held a successful 45-date tour, enabling them to sign with major label MCA Victor in May 1992.

hide gave one of Glay's demo tapes to Yoshiki, who then brought an entourage to watch their October 1993 show, where he offered the band a contract to Extasy Records. Their debut album, Hai to Diamond, was released on May 25, 1994.

To promote their bands, the label organized concerts called Extasy Summits, which besides current contracted bands, also included former acts who had left for major record labels. The first was held at Osaka Bourbon House in September 1988, with several more held, including one at Shibuya Public Hall in September 1989. Footage from two of the concerts was recorded and released on VHS (the second also on Laserdisc);  recorded at the Nippon Budokan in October 1991 and  recorded at Osaka-jō Hall in October 1992. The October 1992 Summit was actually X Japan's first public performance with their new bassist Heath.

The compilation album Lighting & Thunder was released in October 1998. On June 21, 2000, the compilation album History of Extasy 15th Anniversary was released. It includes 19 songs released by 14 different bands while on the label in celebration of its 15th anniversary. The album reached number 14 on the Oricon music chart.

In 2000, Yoshiki signed a deal with Warner Music Group to distribute the record labels Extasy Japan and Extasy Records International. Records on Extasy Japan were distributed in Japan by Warner Music Japan and records on Extasy Records International were distributed in America by Warner Bros. Records, marking the first time the two companies worked together in this way. The first release on Extasy Japan was the July 2000 single "Pearl" by singer Shiro, while the first release on Extasy Records International was by singer Aja in 2001.

In September 2007, Yoshiki announced that the soundtrack for the American movie Catacombs would be released on Extasy Records International. The soundtrack includes songs by Violet UK and Zilch.

Yoshiki has referred to the first day, October 14, 2016, of the three-day Visual Japan Summit at Makuhari Messe as "Extasy Summit" as it saw X Japan, Luna Sea and Glay perform.

Artists
All of the following artists were at one point on the label:

Extasy Records

Acid Bell
Brain Drive
Breath
Deep
Ex-Ans
Gilles de Rais
Glay
Hypermania
La Vie En Rose
Ladies Room
Luna Sea
P2H
Poison/Poison Arts
Magnitude9.8
Screaming Mad George & Psychosis
Sweet Death/Media Youth
The Hate Honey
The Zolge
Tokyo Yankees
Velvet Blue
Virus
X Japan
Youthquake
Zi:Kill

Extasy Japan

Beast
Revenus
Shiro
Shizuka Kudō

Extasy International
Abandoned Pools/Tommy Walter
Aja Daashuur
Kidneythieves
Laura Dawn
Red Delicious
sub.bionic
Violet UK

Extasy Recording Studios
Extasy Recording Studios was a recording studio complex owned by Yoshiki Hayashi at 5253 Lankershim Blvd in North Hollywood, California, United States. Formerly known as One on One Recording, Yoshiki bought it from the previous owner, Jim David, in 1992 and renamed the studio after his record label in 1999. Discussing the purchase in 2010, Yoshiki explained that in Los Angeles people told him that One on One had the "best drum-sounding room" and so he attempted to book recording time there. However, Metallica had it booked for "almost a year straight" for their self-titled album with numerous bands scheduled after that, and he was told sarcastically that the only way to get in was to buy it, so he did.

Previously, well-known albums were recorded there, including ...And Justice for All and Metallica (better known as The Black Album) by Metallica, When the Pawn... by Fiona Apple, Crazy Nights and Psycho Circus by Kiss, and Dirt by Alice in Chains.

Since Yoshiki purchased the facility in 1992, X Japan and Yoshiki's related projects were the main recordings. Extasy Recording Studios was taken over by 17 Hertz, LLC in 2012 and is now known as 17 Hertz Studio.

Yoshiki also bought Brooklyn Recording Studios, which housed the Los Angeles offices of Maverick Records, in April 1998 from owners Madonna and Freddy DeMann. He renamed it One on One South, before using it as the headquarters of Extasy Records International.

References

External links
  (expired)
 Trademark registration dispute of Extasy Records

Recording studios in California
Japanese independent record labels
Japanese record labels
American independent record labels
Heavy metal record labels
Punk record labels
Rock record labels
Record labels established in 1986
1986 establishments in Japan
X Japan